The following is a timeline of the history of the city of Tashkent, Uzbekistan.

Before 20th century

 500 BC – till 5th part of the Kushan empire
 1210 AD – City sacked by forces of Muhammad II of Khwarezm (approximate date).
 1220 – City sacked by forces of Genghis Khan.
 1451 – Dzhuma Mosque built.
 1485 – Yunus Khan in power.
 1569 – Kukeltash Madrasa built.
 1611 – Uprising; crackdown by forces of Imam Quli Khan of Bukhara.
 1809 – City becomes part of the Khanate of Kokand.
 1840 – Cholera outbreak.
 1865
 15 June: City captured by Russian forces led by Mikhail Chernyayev.
 Population: 76,000.
 1867 – City becomes capital of Russian Turkestan, and center of the Syr-Darya Oblast.
 1870
 Turkistan Gaziti newspaper begins publication.
 Trade fair held.
 Kaufmann Library founded.
 1871 – Population: 120,000 (estimate).
 1872 – Cholera outbreak.
 1874 – Turkestan Military District headquartered in Tashkent.
 1876 – National Museum of Turkestan founded.
 1877 – City government reorganized.
 1889 – Trans-Caspian Railway begins operating.
 1892 – 24 June: Demonstration related to public health.
 1895 – Samarkand-Tashkent railway begins operating.
 1896 – Lutheran Church built.
 1897 – Population: 156,506.
 1898 – Russian Orthodox church built in Amir Temur Square.

20th century
 1901 – Horsecar trams begin operating.
 1904 – Orenburg-Tashkent Railway begins operating.
 1905 – "Mutiny of Tsarist officers."
 1910 – Monument to Konstantin von Kaufman dedicated.
 1913 – Population: 172,300.
 1914 – Military college established.
 1916 – "Anti-labour conscription revolt."
 1917
 February Revolution.
 2 March: Tashkent Soviet established.
 April: Turkestan Muslim Congress held.
 Pravda Vostoka newspaper begins publication.
 1918
 April: City becomes capital of the Turkestan Autonomous Soviet Socialist Republic.
 Turkestan People's University and Turkestan People's Conservatory founded.
 1920 – National Public Library of Uzbekistan established (approximate date).
 1924
 City becomes part of the Uzbek Soviet Socialist Republic.
 Uthman Quran relocated to Tashkent from Ufa.
 Tashkent Zoo founded.
 1925 – Sharq Yulduzi film studio established.
 1926 – Population: 323,000.
 1930
 Capital of Uzbek Soviet Socialist Republic relocated to Tashkent from Samarkand.
 Central Asian Construction Institute and Tashkent Communication Polytechnic founded.
 1931 – Central Asian Institute of Railway Engineers and Central Asian Institute of Economics founded.
 1932 – Arts Study Institute founded.
 1938 – City becomes capital of Tashkent Province.
 1939 – Komsomol Lake in Stalin Park.
 1943 – Academy of Sciences of the Uzbek SSR established.
 1947 – Navoi Theatre built.
 1955 – Tashkent Electro Technical Institute of Communication founded.
 1956
 Pakhtakor football club formed.
 Pakhtakor Markaziy Stadium opens.
 1962 – Haskovo (Bulgaria)-Tashkent brother-city program established.
 1964 – Tashkent Palace of Arts built.
 1965 – Population: 1,092,000.
 1966
 January: City hosts signing of India-Pakistan peace agreement.
 26 April: The M5.1 Tashkent earthquake destroys much of the city, leaving between 15 and 200 people dead, and around 300,000 homeless.
 1971 – Spartak Tashkent ice hockey team formed.
 1973 – Sister city relationship established with Seattle, USA.
 1977 – Tashkent Metro begins operating.
 1979 – Population: 1,858,000.
 1984 – Tashkent Tower built.
 1985 – Population: 2,030,000 (estimate).
 1988 – Seattle-Tashkent Peace Park dedicated.
 1991
 City becomes capital of the Republic of Uzbekistan.
 Tashkent State Institute of Law and Tashkent Architectural Building Institute established. 
 1992 – Statue of Vladimir Lenin in Independence Square removed.
 1994 – Tashkent Stock Exchange and Tashkent International School established.
 1996
 Amir Timur Museum established.
 Kuyluk Market built.
 1998 – JAR Stadium opens.
 1999
 16 February: Bombings.
 Tashkent Open tennis tournament begins.
 Crying Mother Monument erected.

21st century

 2001
 Tashkent International Airport terminal rebuilt.
 Population: 2,137,218.
 2003 – May: City hosts meeting of European Bank for Reconstruction and Development.
 2004 – July: Bombings.
 2005 – Bunyodkor PFK football club formed.
 2008 – Tashkent Challenger tennis tournament begins.
 2011 – Tashkent–Samarkand high-speed rail line begins operating.
 2018 - Population: 2,464,933 (estimate).

See also

 Tashkent history
 
 Districts of Tashkent
 Other names of Tashkent
 Timeline of Samarkand

References

This article incorporates information from the Russian Wikipedia and the Ukrainian Wikipedia.

Bibliography

Published in  19th century

Published in 20th century

Published in 21st century
 
 
 Jeff Sahadeo, Russian Colonial Society in Tashkent, 1865–1923 (Bloomington, IN, Indiana University Press, 2010).

External links

 
Tashkent
Tashkent, Timeline History
Years in Uzbekistan
Tashkent